Sinivit Rural LLG is a local-level government (LLG) of East New Britain Province, Papua New Guinea.

Wards
01. Rieit
02. Arabam
03. Maranagi
04. Reigal
05. Sanbum
06. Marambu
07. Lat
08. Gar
09. Merai
10. Ili
11. Karong
12. Sunam
13. Marunga (Mali language speakers)
14. Kavudemki (Simbali language speakers)
15. Tol
16. Sikut
17. Ivon/Gore
18. Laup
19. Kadalung No. 1

References

Local-level governments of East New Britain Province